New Hollow is an American rock band from New Albany, Ohio. The band was composed of Michael "Mookie" Clouse, Evan West & Chad Blashford (departed in 2018).

New Hollow was founded by three students at New Albany High School (Ohio), who initially began playing together while still elementary school students under the name Monkee Hollow. The single, entitled "SiCK", was released November 1, 2010, and reached the Billboard Hot 100, where it peaked at number 86. The single sold over 28,000 physical copies in its first week, en route to selling 140,000 units by early 2011. The group signed an agreement with Justice, a girls' clothing store, to market their debut single, with that deal ending in April 2013.

In November 2010, the band also performed The Star-Spangled Banner at the nationally televised Thanksgiving Day football game between the New Orleans Saints and the Dallas Cowboys on Fox TV. 

On Jan. 23, 2011, the band released their second single "Boyfriend" and it entered the Billboard Hot 100 chart on Feb. 3, 2011, where it peaked at number 96.

On May 27, 2011, the band released their third single, a rock cover of the B.o.B/Hayley Williams song, "Airplanes", which charted at number 12 on the Bubbling Under Hot 100 chart.

On December 13, 2012, New Hollow's cover over "Airplanes" reappeared in the Billboard Hot Single Sales Chart at number 12 and the following week, "SiCK" & "Boyfriend" also re-entered the chart.

On July 3, 2013, the band's fourth single, an original titled, She Ain't You began getting airplay on SiriusXM radio.

In December 2013, She Ain't You was voted the "Breakthrough Song Of 2013" by The Pulse (Sirius XM), beating out "Let Her Go" by Passenger (singer), "Best Day of My Life" by American Authors and "Say Something" by A Great Big World.

On January 1, 2014, She Ain't You was voted the #18 song of year on The Pulse (Sirius XM) "Top 30 Countdown Of 2013".

On January 24, 2014, New Hollow signed a multi-album recording contract with LA Reid and Epic Records. She Ain't You was re-released and peaked in the twenties on both the Mediabase Top 40 and Hot AC charts.

The song "Jackie's Baby" co-written by Clouse & West with John Popper and featuring New Hollow was released in April 2015 on the new Blues Traveler album Blow Up the Moon.

In May 2015, New Hollow parted ways with Epic Records. In June 2015, the band signed a new deal with Bee & El/Sony Music Entertainment. New Hollow went in the studio to record with Michael J. Clouse and British producer Mikal Blue (OneRepublic, Colbie Caillat, Jason Mraz, Five For Fighting).

On July 8, 2015, the band released their self-penned single, Why Don't You Love Me

On June 3, 2016, Popstar (Is This What The Girls Like?) was released by 614 Music/Bee & El/Sony Music Entertainment.

In 2018, West and Clouse relocated to Nashville, TN where they continue to write, record and produce.

In 2019, the band released a single called "A Thing".

In 2020, they released three more singles: "Calling All the Time", "White Converse", and "Crown Vic".

Members
Mookie Clouse - guitar, drums, piano, bass, lead vocals
Evan West - guitar, drums, keyboards, bass, lead vocals

Singles

References

Musical groups established in 2010
Rock music groups from Ohio
People from New Albany, Ohio
2010 establishments in Ohio